Andrew Bruce Boa (10 July 1930 – 17 April 2004) was a Canadian actor, who found success playing the token American in British films and television, usually playing military types. Boa's most recognizable film role is in The Empire Strikes Back (1980) as General Rieekan. On television, his most notable role is probably as the brash and rude American guest, Mr. Harry Hamilton, in the Fawlty Towers episode "Waldorf Salad".

Early life
Bruce Boa was born on 10 July 1930 in Calgary, Alberta, the second of three children of Ila (née Phinn) and Andrew Boa, a clergyman. His older sister was Jungian analyst and author Marion Woodman, and his younger brother was Fraser Boa, also a Jungian analyst, who died in 1992. Boa attended the University of Western Ontario, graduating in 1952 with a degree in theology, then spent a brief period playing professional football for the Calgary Stampeders in 1952.

After travelling through Europe, he began his acting career in England in 1956 and settled there permanently in the 1960s. In a 1959 interview he stated that he was also writing novels and film scripts; however, it would appear these works were not published or filmed.

Career
Boa's film credits include Man in the Middle (1964), The Adding Machine (1969), Who? (1973), The Cherry Picker (1974), The Omen (1976), Silver Bears, Superman, Carry On Emmannuelle (1978), A Touch of the Sun, The London Connection, A Nightingale Sang in Berkeley Square (1979), Silver Dream Racer (1980), Ragtime (1981), Octopussy (1983), Return to Oz (1985), and Screamers (1995). He also played the Marine colonel in Full Metal Jacket (1987) who chastises Matthew Modine's character over having a peace pin on his lapel while having "Born To Kill" written on his combat helmet.

On television, he appeared in Thriller (1975), in 1977 Come Back, Little Sheba, an episode of Laurence Olivier Presents, opposite Laurence Olivier and Joanne Woodward. Other television credits include: Fawlty Towers, The Avengers, Out of the Unknown, The Champions, The Troubleshooters, The Saint, Ace of Wands, Special Branch, The Onedin Line, Z-Cars, The New Avengers, The Professionals, The Omega Factor, Dempsey & Makepeace, Astronauts, Hart to Hart, Remington Steele, Howards' Way, the 1979 miniseries A Man Called Intrepid, the 1988 television film The Bourne Identity,  Tales of the Unexpected, As Time Goes By, Road to Avonlea, Kavanagh QC, Bulman and Warship.

Death
Boa died from cancer on 17 April 2004 in Surrey, England.

Filmography

Film

Television

References

External links

 Bruce Boa BFI

1930 births
2004 deaths
Calgary Stampeders players
Canadian expatriates in England
Canadian male television actors
Canadian male film actors
Deaths from cancer in England
Male actors from Calgary
Canadian football people from Calgary
Players of Canadian football from Alberta
Western Mustangs football players
University of Western Ontario alumni
20th-century Canadian male actors